Juliano Ribeiro Salgado (born in 1974) is a Brazilian filmmaker, director, and writer.

Personal life
He is the son of photographer Sebastião Salgado and architect Lélia Wanick Salgado, who have been married since 1967. His brother Rodrigo, who has Down syndrome, was born in 1979. Juliano Ribeiro has a son, Flavio.

Partial filmography
 Paris la métisse (2005)
 Nauru, An Island Adrift (2009)
 The Salt of the Earth (2014) – director together with Wim Wenders

References

External links
 https://www.imdb.com/name/nm2081382/

Living people
1974 births
Brazilian film directors
Alumni of the London Film School